The 2021–22 Handball-Bundesliga (known as the Liqui Moly Handball-Bundesliga for sponsorship reasons) was the 57th season of the Handball-Bundesliga, Germany's premier handball league and the 45th season consisting of only one league. It ram from 8 September 2021 to 12 June 2022.

SC Magdeburg won their second title.

Teams

Team changes

Arenas and locations
The following 18 clubs competed in the Handball-Bundesliga during the 2021–22 season:

League table

Results

Top goalscorers

See also
 2021–22 DHB-Pokal
 2021–22 2. Handball-Bundesliga

Notes

References

External links
Official website

Handball-Bundesliga
2021 in German sport
2022 in German sport
Germany